

389001–389100 

|-bgcolor=#f2f2f2
| colspan=4 align=center | 
|}

389101–389200 

|-bgcolor=#f2f2f2
| colspan=4 align=center | 
|}

389201–389300 

|-id=293
| 389293 Hasubick ||  || Werner Hasubick (born 1960) is a German amateur astronomer and an enthusiastic observer of comets. Hasubick started his astronomical work at the Buchloe Observatory in 1977 with the observation || 
|}

389301–389400 

|-bgcolor=#f2f2f2
| colspan=4 align=center | 
|}

389401–389500 

|-id=470
| 389470 Jan ||  || Jan Bosch-Pellicer (born 2010) is the second grandson of the discoverer. || 
|-id=478
| 389478 Rivera-Valentín ||  || Edgar G. Rivera-Valentín (born 1986) is a scientist at the Lunar and Planetary Institute. His research focuses on the interactions of processes, such as atmosphere-regolith interactions, impact cratering's interactions with a body's composition, and interactions between radar and the near-surface of asteroids and planetary surfaces. || 
|}

389501–389600 

|-bgcolor=#f2f2f2
| colspan=4 align=center | 
|}

389601–389700 

|-bgcolor=#f2f2f2
| colspan=4 align=center | 
|}

389701–389800 

|-bgcolor=#f2f2f2
| colspan=4 align=center | 
|}

389801–389900 

|-bgcolor=#f2f2f2
| colspan=4 align=center | 
|}

389901–390000 

|-bgcolor=#f2f2f2
| colspan=4 align=center | 
|}

References 

389001-390000